Albert the Magnanimous KG, elected King of the Romans as Albert II (10 August 139727 October 1439) was king of the Holy Roman Empire and a member of the House of Habsburg. By inheritance he became Albert V, Duke of Austria. Through his wife (jure uxoris) he also became King of Hungary, Croatia, Bohemia, and inherited a claim to the Duchy of Luxembourg.

Biography

Albert was born in Vienna as the son of Albert IV, Duke of Austria, and Joanna Sophia of Bavaria.

He succeeded to the Duchy of Austria at the age of seven on his father's death in 1404. His uncle Duke William of Inner Austria, then head of the rivaling Leopoldinian line, served as regent for his nephew, followed by his brothers Leopold IV and Ernest the Iron in 1406. The quarrels between the brothers and their continued attempts to gain control over the Albertinian territories led to civil war-like conditions. Nevertheless, Albert, having received a good education, undertook the government of Austria proper on the occasion of Leopold's death in 1411 and succeeded, with the aid of his advisers, in ridding the duchy of the evils which had arisen during his minority.

In 1422 Albert married Elisabeth of Luxemburg, the daughter and heiress of the King Sigismund of Hungary (later also Holy Roman Emperor and King of Bohemia), and his second wife, the Slovenian noblewoman Barbara of Celje. Besides Hungary, Albert's marriage brought him claims to several Slavic kingdoms and principalities as well.

Albert assisted his father-in-law Sigismund in his campaigns against the Hussites, involving the Austrian duchy in the Hussite Wars. In return Sigismund designated him as his successor and granted him the title of a Margrave of Moravia in 1423. The Austrian lands were devastated several times and Albert also participated in the 1431 Battle of Domažlice where the Imperial troops suffered an embarrassing defeat.

When Sigismund died in 1437, Albert was crowned king of Hungary on 1 January 1438, and just as his predecessor did, he moved his court to the Hungarian Kingdom from where he later oversaw his other domains. Although crowned king of Bohemia six months after ascending to the Hungarian throne, he was unable to obtain possession of the country. He was engaged in warfare with the Bohemians and their Polish allies, when on 18 March 1438, he was chosen "King of the Romans" at Frankfurt, an honour which he does not appear to have sought. He was never crowned as Holy Roman Emperor.

Afterwards engaged in defending Hungary against the attacks of the Turks, he died on 27 October 1439 at Neszmély and was buried at Székesfehérvár. Albert was an energetic and warlike prince, whose short reign as a triple king gave great promise of usefulness for the Holy Roman Empire.

Expulsion of the Jews
Though the Jews in the Austrian duchy had been subject to local persecutions during the 13th and 14th century, their position remained relatively safe. Jewish communities prospered in several towns like Krems or the area around the Judenplatz at Vienna. During the confusion after the death of Duke Albert IV in 1404 their situation worsened sharply, culminating in the blaze of the Vienna synagogue on 5 November 1406, followed by riots and lootings.

When Albert V came of age in 1411 and interfered in the Hussite Wars, he repeatedly established new taxes imposed on the Jewish community to finance his campaigns. On the other hand, after the Hussites had devastated the duchy, the Austrian Jews were accused of collaboration and arms trade in favour of the enemies. The accusations of a host desecration at Enns in 1420 gave Albert pretext for the destruction of the Jewish community.

According to the 1463 Chronica Austriae by chronicler Thomas Ebendorfer, the duke on 23 May 1420, at the behest of the Church, ordered the imprisonment and forcible conversion of the Jews. Those that had not converted or escaped were sent off in boats down the Danube, while wealthy Jews remained under arrest, several of them tortured and stripped of their property. The forced baptism of Jewish children was stopped on intervention by Pope Martin V. On 12 March 1421 Albert sentenced the remaining Jews to death. Ninety-two men and 120 women were burned at the stake south of the Vienna city walls on 12 March 1421. The Jews were placed under an "eternal ban" and their synagogue was demolished. The persecutions in several Austrian towns are explicitly described in a 16th-century script called Vienna Gesera.

Full title

Full titulature Albert possessed went as follows: Albert, by the grace of God elected King of the Romans, always August, King of Hungary, Dalmatia, Croatia, Rama, Serbia, Galicia, Lodomeria, Cumania and Bulgaria, elected King of Bohemia, duke of Austria, Styria, Carinthia and Carniola, margrave of Moravia, Lord of the Wendish March and Port Naon, Count of Habsburg, Tyrol, Ferrete and Kyburg, etc. Margrave of Burgau and landgrave of Alsace.

In practise he often used a shorter version: Albert, by the grace of God elected King of the Romans, always August, King of Hungary, Dalmatia and Croatia, etc. elected King of Bohemia, duke of Austria, Styria, Carinthia and Carniola, Margrave of Moravia and Count of Tyrol, etc.

Family

His children with Elisabeth of Bohemia were:
 Anne of Austria (1432–1462), who married William III, Duke of Saxony. William became (1457–69) Duke of Luxembourg, in right of his wife
 Elisabeth (1438–1505), who married Casimir IV of Poland, and whose son Vladislaus II of Bohemia later became king of Bohemia and Hungary
 George (born and died at Vienna on 16 February 1435)
 Ladislas V Posthumus of Bohemia, King of Hungary and Bohemia

Ancestors

See also
Kings of Germany family tree. He was related to every other German king.

Notes

References

External links

 
 Tripota – Trier portrait database
 Illustration by Francesco Terzio from 1569: Albertus II, Imp.
 
 

|-

|-

Albert 2 of Germany
Albert 2 of Germany
15th-century dukes of Austria
15th-century Kings of the Romans
Kings of Hungary
Habsburg kings of Bohemia
Kings of Croatia
Knights of the Garter
Nobility from Vienna
Medieval child monarchs
Burials at the Basilica of the Assumption of the Blessed Virgin Mary
15th-century people of the Holy Roman Empire